The Abram Allen House is a historic house with walls of grout, built about 1853 in Milton, Wisconsin. It was added to the National Register of Historic Places in 1978.

Description and history 
It is designed in the Vernacular Greek Revival style. It was completed in 1853 and was built by early settler Abram Allen (1799-1875) on a limestone foundation, and sold by him soon after.

References

Greek Revival houses in Wisconsin
Houses in Rock County, Wisconsin
Houses on the National Register of Historic Places in Wisconsin
National Register of Historic Places in Rock County, Wisconsin
Houses completed in 1853
Vernacular architecture in Wisconsin